Bloomfield Township is the name of some places in the U.S. state of Michigan:
Bloomfield Township, Huron County, Michigan
Bloomfield Township, Missaukee County, Michigan
Bloomfield Township, Oakland County, Michigan

See also
 Bloomfield Hills, Michigan
 Blumfield Township, Michigan
 Bloomfield Township (disambiguation)

Michigan township disambiguation pages